Allison Pamela Roe  (née Deed; born 30 May 1956) is a New Zealand politician and former long-distance athlete.

Athletics career 
Roe was born in Auckland in 1956. In 1981, she won both the Boston Marathon and New York City Marathon, becoming the second of only two women to accomplish the feat in the same year. In Boston, she ran 2:26:46 to improve the course record by almost eight minutes, set the previous year by Jacqueline Gareau. In New York, she set a world best women's marathon time with 2:25:29, to break Grete Waitz's time of 2:25:42 from the 1980 New York Marathon. However, after re-measurement, the 1981 course was found to be 150 metres short, though Waitz's 1980 record is also disputed. Also in 1981, she set a 20 km world record in Miyazaki, Japan.

In the 1993 Queen's Birthday Honours, Roe was appointed a Member of the Order of the British Empire, for services to athletics.

Political career
In the 2013 Auckland elections, Roe was elected to the Waitematā District Health Board and the Devonport-Takapuna Local Board. In the 2016 elections, Roe joined the Rodney First ticket and stood for re-election for the Health Board and election to the Rodney Local Board. She was successful in both contests with the second most popular and most popular votes respectively.

Achievements
All results regarding marathon, unless stated otherwise

References

External links 
 Official website
 

1956 births
Living people
New Zealand female long-distance runners
Athletes from Auckland
Boston Marathon female winners
New York City Marathon female winners
New Zealand Members of the Order of the British Empire
Local politicians in New Zealand
Waitemata District Health Board members
People educated at Westlake Girls High School
20th-century New Zealand women
21st-century New Zealand women